Serratovolva luteocincta is a species of sea snail, a marine gastropod mollusk in the family Ovulidae, the ovulids, cowry allies or false cowries.

Description
The length of the shell attains 6.4 mm.

Distribution
This species occurs in the China Seas at a depth of 180 m.

References

 Celzard, A. (2008). Description of a new species of Ovulidae (Gastropoda : Cypraeoidea) from East China Sea. Gloria Maris. 47(3), 61-64.
 Lorenz F. & Fehse D. (2009) The living Ovulidae. A manual of the families of allied cowries: Ovulidae, Pediculariidae and Eocypraeidae. Hackenheim: Conchbooks.

Ovulidae
Gastropods described in 2008